Rajeshwar Shastri Dravid (1899 – 1950) was an Indian writer, scholar, grammarian and translator of Sanskrit literature. Born in 1899 in the Indian state of Uttar Pradesh, he was the author several books in Sanskrit which included Sāṅkhyakārikā, Bhāratīya-rājanīti-prakaśah and R̥ṣikalpanyāsaḥ. His brother, Raja Ram Dravid, was the author of The Problem of Universals in Indian Philosophy, a critique of ancient Indian philosophy. The Government of India awarded him Padma Bhushan, the third highest Indian civilian award, in 1960.

Bibliography

See also

 Arthashastra
 Tarka-Sangraha

References

External links
 
 
 
 

Recipients of the Padma Bhushan in literature & education
20th-century Indian translators
Sanskrit scholars from Uttar Pradesh
Year of death missing
Writers from Uttar Pradesh
1899 births
Sanskrit writers
Sanskrit grammarians